Dendrobium parishii (Parish's dendrobium) is a species of orchid native to Asia.

It was named by Heinrich Gustav Reichenbach in honour of the botanist and plant collector Charles Parish, in 1863.

It is native to the Eastern Himalayas (Assam, Arunachal Pradesh, northern Bangladesh), China (Yunnan, Guizhou) and Indochina (Thailand, Myanmar, Laos, Cambodia, and Vietnam).

References 

 PS Lavarack, W Harris, G Stocker, (2000). Dendrobium and its relatives, Timber Press, .

External links
 

parishii
Epiphytic orchids
Flora of East Himalaya
Flora of Indo-China
Plants described in 1863